Rachispoda is a genus of flies belonging to the family Lesser Dung flies.

Species
R. acrosticalis (Becker, 1903)
R. aeditua Wheeler in Wheeler & Marshall, 1995
R. aemula (Roháček, 1993)
R. aequipilosa (Duda, 1925)
R. afghanica (Papp, 1978)
R. afra (Roháček, 1991)
R. alces Wheeler in Wheeler & Marshall, 1995
R. amarilla Wheeler in Wheeler & Marshall, 1995
R. anathema Wheeler, 1995
R. anceps (Stenhammar, 1855)
R. andina Wheeler in Wheeler & Marshall, 1995
R. ariana (Papp, 1978) 
R. arnaudi Wheeler, 1995
R. aroana (Richards, 1973)
R. atra (Adams, 1903)
R. atrolimosa (Frey, 1945)
R. australica (Duda, 1925)
R. awalensis (Richards, 1973)
R. baezensis Wheeler in Wheeler & Marshall, 1995
R. barbata (Sabrosky, 1949)
R. bipilosa (Duda, 1925)
R. boninensis (Richards, 1963)
R. breviceps (Stenhammar, 1855)
R. brevior (Roháček, 1983)
R. breviseta (Malloch, 1914)
R. caesia Wheeler in Wheeler & Marshall, 1995
R. canadensis Wheeler, 1995
R. caudatula (Roháček, 1991)
R. cesta Wheeler in Wheeler & Marshall, 1995
R. chisholmae Wheeler in Wheeler and Marshall, 1995
R. cilifera (Rondani, 1880)
R. clivicola Wheeler in Wheeler & Marshall, 1995
R. colombiana Wheeler in Wheeler & Marshall, 1995
R. condyla Wheeler in Wheeler & Marshall, 1995
R. congoensis (Vanschuytbroeck, 1950)
R. conradti (Duda, 1925)
R. cryptica (Sabrosky, 1949)
R. cryptistyla Wheeler, 1995
R. cryptochaeta (Duda, 1918)
R. decimsetosa (Richards, 1931)
R. digitata Wheeler, 1995
R. disciseta (Richards, 1963)
R. divergens (Duda, 1925)
R. dolorosa (Williston, 1896)
R. duodecimseta (Papp, 1973)
R. duplex (Roháček, 1991)
R. eurystyla Wheeler, 1995
R. excavata (Papp, 1979)
R. falcicula Wheeler, 1995
R. filiforceps (Duda, 1925)
R. forceps (Sabrosky, 1949)
R. forficula Wheeler in Wheeler & Marshall, 1995
R. freyi (Hackman, 1958)
R. frosti (C. W. Johnson, 1915)
R. fumipennis (Spuler, 1924)
R. fuscinervis (Malloch, 1912)
R. fuscipennis (Haliday, 1833)
R. gel (Papp, 1978) 
R. geneiates Wheeler in Wheeler & Marshall, 1995
R. gobiensis (Papp, 1974)
R. hammersteini (Duda, 1925)
R. hoplites (Spuler, 1924)
R. hostica (Villeneuve, 1917)
R. iberica (Roháček, 1991)
R. intermedia (Duda, 1918)
R. intonsa Wheeler in Wheeler & Marshall, 1995
R. joycei Wheeler in Wheeler & Marshall, 1995
R. justini Wheeler in Wheeler & Marshall, 1995
R. kabuli (Papp, 1978)
R. kaieteurana Wheeler in Wheeler & Marshall, 1995
R. kuntzei (Duda, 1918)
R. lacustrina Wheeler, 1995
R. latiforceps (Sabrosky, 1949)
R. laureata Wheeler in Wheeler & Marshall, 1995
R. limosa (Fallén, 1820)
R. longior (Roháček, 1991)
R. lucaris Wheeler in Wheeler & Marshall, 1995
R. lugubrina (Zetterstedt, 1847)
R. luisi Wheeler in Wheeler & Marshall, 1995
R. luminosa Wheeler in Wheeler & Marshall, 1995
R. lutosa (Stenhammar, 1855)
R. lutosoidea (Duda, 1938)
R. m-nigrum (Malloch, 1912)
R. macalpinei (Richards, 1973)
R. maculinea (Richards, 1966)
R. marginalis (Malloch, 1914)
R. meges (Papp, 1978)
R. melanderi (Sabrosky, 1949)
R. merga Wheeler in Wheeler & Marshall, 1995
R. meringoterga Wheeler in Wheeler & Marshall, 1995
R. mexicana Wheeler, 1995
R. michigana (Sabrosky, 1949)
R. microarista (Papp, 1973)
R. multisetosa (Duda, 1925)
R. mycophora (Munari, 1995)
R. nebulosa (de Meijere, 1916)
R. obfuscata (Tucker, 1907)
R. ochrocephala (Munari, 1989)
R. octisetosa (Becker, 1903)
R. omega (Sabrosky, 1949)
R. opinata (Roháček, 1991)
R. oreadis Wheeler in Wheeler & Marshall, 1995
R. paludicola Wheeler in Wheeler & Marshall, 1995
R. papuana (Richards, 1973)
R. paralutosa (Papp, 1973)
R. pectinata Wheeler, 1995
R. pereger Wheeler, 1995
R. persica (Roháček, 1993)
R. pluriseta (Duda, 1925)
R. praealta Wheeler in Wheeler & Marshall, 1995
R. praealta Wheeler in Wheeler & Marshall, 1995
R. praeapicalis (Papp, 1979)
R. promissa (Duda, 1925)
R. pseudocilifera (Papp, 1974)
R. pseudohostica (Duda, 1924)
R. pseudooctisetosa (Duda, 1925)
R. quadrilineata (de Meijere, 1918)
R. quadriseta (Duda, 1938)
R. recavisterna Wheeler in Wheeler & Marshall, 1995
R. rhizophora Wheeler, 1995
R. richardsi (Sabrosky, 1949)
R. rutshuruensis (Vanschuytbroeck, 1950)
R. sajanica (Papp, 1979)
R. sauteri (Duda, 1925)
R. schildi (Spuler, 1924)
R. scotti (Richards, 1939)
R. segem (Roháček, 1991)
R. spatulata Wheeler, 1995
R. spinicaudata (Papp, 1973)
R. spinisterna (Papp, 1974)
R. spuleri (Sabrosky, 1949)
R. striata (Duda, 1925)
R. suberecta (Sabrosky, 1949)
R. subpiligera (Malloch, 1914)
R. subsolana Wheeler, 1995
R. subtinctipennis (Brunetti, 1913)
R. subulata Wheeler, 1995
R. synoria Wheeler in Wheeler & Marshall, 1995
R. tenaculata (Sabrosky, 1949)
R. territorialis (Richards, 1973)
R. thaliathrix Wheeler in Wheeler & Marshall, 1995
R. thermastris Wheeler in Wheeler & Marshall, 1995
R. trichopyga Wheeler in Wheeler & Marshall, 1995
R. trifascigera (Malloch, 1928)
R. trigonata (Spuler, 1924)
R. trochanterata (Malloch, 1913)
R. tuberosa (Duda, 1938)
R. unca (Roháček, 1993)
R. uniseta (Roháček, 1991)
R. urodela (Sabrosky, 1949)
R. varicornis (Strobl, 1900)
R. velutina (Séguy, 1933)
R. villosa Wheeler in Wheeler & Marshall, 1995
R. zygolepis Wheeler in Wheler & Marshall, 1995

References

Sphaeroceridae
Diptera of Africa
Diptera of Asia
Diptera of Europe
Diptera of South America
Diptera of North America
Brachycera genera